Panniwala Ruldu is a village in Dabwali subdistrict of Sirsa, Haryana, India.

Education
For primary education, there are two schools; one for girls and another for boys. For upper primary education the village has a governmental high school.

References

Villages in Sirsa district